Paulin Ladeuze (1870–1940) was a Belgian bishop and theologian.

Biography
Paulin Ladeuze was born in Harveng, Belgium on 3 July 1870.

He was educated at the Catholic University of Leuven, and became its rector in 1909, serving until his death.

He was a contributor to the Catholic Encyclopedia.

He died in Brussels on 10 February 1940.

References

External links

 

1870 births
1940 deaths
20th-century Belgian Roman Catholic theologians
Belgian Roman Catholic titular bishops
Catholic University of Leuven (1834–1968) alumni
Academic staff of the Catholic University of Leuven (1834–1968)
Contributors to the Catholic Encyclopedia
People from Mons